John William Scott (September 3, 1887 – December 2, 1962), also known as Jim Scott, was a professional baseball shortstop who played from 1909 through 1915, including part of the 1914 season with the Pittsburgh Rebels of the Federal League (considered a major league).

External links

1887 births
1962 deaths
Major League Baseball shortstops
Pittsburgh Rebels players
Paris Bourbonites players
Flint Vehicles players
Erie Sailors players
Chicago Keeleys players
Indianapolis Hoosiers (minor league) players
St. Louis Terriers players
Erie Yankees players
People from Cincinnati
Baseball players from Ohio